Emil Zátopek (19 September 1922 – 21 November 2000) was a Czech long-distance runner best known for winning three gold medals at the 1952 Summer Olympics in Helsinki. He won gold in the 5,000 metres and 10,000 metres runs, but his final medal came when he decided at the last minute to compete in the first marathon of his life. He was nicknamed the "Czech Locomotive".

In 1954, Zátopek was the first runner to break the 29-minute barrier in the 10,000 metres. Three years earlier in 1951, he had broken the hour for running 20 km. He was considered one of the greatest runners of the 20th century and was also known for his brutally tough training methods. He popularised interval training after World War Two.

In February 2013, the editors at Runner's World Magazine selected him as the Greatest Runner of All Time. He is the only person to win the 5,000 metres (24 July 1952), 10,000 metres  (20 July 1952) and Marathon (27 July 1952),  in the same Olympic Games.

Early years
Zátopek was the seventh child in a modest family. Aged 16, he began working in the Bata shoe factory in Zlín. Zátopek says that "One day, the factory sports coach, who was very strict, pointed at four boys, including me, and ordered us to run in a race. I protested that I was weak and not fit to run, but the coach sent me for a physical examination, and the doctor said that I was perfectly well. So I had to run, and when I got started, I felt I wanted to win. But I only came in second. That was the way it started."  Zátopek finished second out of the field of 100. After that point, he began to take a serious interest in running. He joined the local athletic club, where he developed his own training programme, modelled on what he had read about the great Finnish Olympian Paavo Nurmi.

A mere four years later, in 1944, Zátopek broke the Czechoslovak records for 2,000, 3,000 and 5,000 metres. At the end of the war he joined the Czechoslovak Army, where he was gradually given more time for his gruelling training regimen.

Competitions

Zátopek was selected for the Czechoslovak national team for the 1946 European Championships in Oslo and finished fifth in the 5,000 m in 14:25.8, breaking his own Czechoslovak record of 14:50.2. At the 1948 Summer Olympics in London, Zátopek won the 10,000 m and finished second behind Gaston Reiff from Belgium during a driving rainstorm in the 5,000 m.

The following year, Zátopek broke the 10,000 m world record twice, and went on to better his own record three times over the next four seasons. He also set records in the 5,000 m (1954), 20,000 m (twice in 1951), one-hour run (twice in 1951), 25,000 m (1952 and 1955), and 30,000 m (1952). He won the 5,000 m and 10,000 m at the 1950 European Championships and the 10,000 m at the next European Championships, ahead of Jozsef Kovacs and Frank Sando.

At the 1952 Summer Olympics in Helsinki, Zátopek won gold in the 5,000 m, 10,000 m, and the marathon, breaking Olympic records in each event. Zátopek is the only person to win these three long-distance events in the same Olympic games. His victory in the 5,000 m came after a ferocious last lap in 57.5 seconds, during which he went from fourth place to first in the final turn, passing first Alain Mimoun of France, then Herbert Schade of West Germany, and finally Chris Chataway of Great Britain. Zátopek's final medal came when he decided at the last minute to compete in the marathon for the first time in his life, and won. His strategy for the marathon was simple: he raced alongside Jim Peters, the British world-record holder. After a punishing first fifteen kilometres, in which Peters knew he had overtaxed himself, Zátopek asked the Englishman what he thought of the race thus far. The astonished Peters told the Czech that the pace was "too slow," in an attempt to slip up Zátopek, at which point Zátopek simply accelerated. Peters did not finish, while Zátopek won the race and set an Olympic record. Zátopek running in his first Marathon, beat second placed Reinaldo Gorno (Argentina) by 2:01 minutes.

Zátopek attempted to defend his marathon gold medal in 1956; however, he suffered a groin injury while training and was hospitalized for six weeks. He resumed training the day after leaving hospital, but never quite regained his form. He finished sixth in the marathon, which was won by his old rival and friend Alain Mimoun. Zátopek retired from competition in 1957.

Zátopek's running style was distinctive and very much at odds with what was considered to be an efficient style at the time. His head would often roll, face contorted with effort, while his torso swung from side to side. He often wheezed and panted audibly while running, which earned him the nicknames of "Emil the Terrible" or the "Czech Locomotive". When asked about his tortured facial expressions, Zátopek is said to have replied that "It isn't gymnastics or figure skating, you know." In addition he would train in any weather, including snow, and would often do so while wearing heavy work boots as opposed to special running shoes. He was always willing to give advice to other runners. One example he often gave was always to be relaxed and to help ensure that while running, gently touch the tip of your thumb with the tip of your index or middle finger. Just making that slight contact would ensure that arms and shoulders remained relaxed.

Personal life
His wife Dana Zátopková (born the same day and year as her husband) won a gold medal in the javelin throw at the 1952 Olympics, only a few moments after Emil's victory in the 5,000 m; she finished second at the 1960 Olympics. An example of the playful relationship between husband and wife came when Emil attempted to take some credit for his wife's Olympic victory at her press conference, claiming that it was his victory in the 5,000 m that had "inspired" her. Dana's indignant response was, "Really? Okay, go inspire some other girl and see if she throws a javelin fifty metres!".

Zátopek was known for his friendly and gregarious personality and for his ability to speak six languages. He was regularly visited at his home in Prague by international athletes he had befriended at competitions. His British rival Gordon Pirie described it as "the merriest and gayest home I've been in".

Emil and Dana were the witnesses at the wedding ceremony of Olympic gold medalists Olga Fikotová and Harold Connolly in Prague in 1957. Emil had spoken to the Czechoslovak president Antonín Zápotocký to request help in getting national heroine Olga a permit to marry the American Connolly, at the height of the Cold War. While it's not clear how much this helped, they unexpectedly received a permit a few days later.

In 1966 Zátopek hosted the Australian Ron Clarke when he visited Prague for a race. Zátopek knew the bad luck that Clarke had faced; he held many middle-distance track and field world records and had attempted to join his idol in the record books, but had fallen short in winning an Olympic gold medal (he was beaten by Billy Mills in one of the biggest upsets in Olympic history). At the end of the visit, Zátopek gave one of his gold medals from the 1952 Olympics to Clarke.

Later years and death
A hero in his native country, Zátopek was an influential figure in the Communist Party. However, he supported the party's democratic wing and, after the 1968 Prague Spring, he was stripped of his rank and expelled from the army and the party, removed from all important positions and forced to work in a string of menial manual labour positions.

He gained employment in one of the few companies not discouraged from employing out-of-favour citizens. The company was "Stavební Geologie", and he was immediately put to work prospecting for natural resources around Bohemia, infrequently being able to visit his wife in Prague. His work in such a field gave rise to the rumour that he had been sent (as many before him were) to the uranium mine concentration camps; however, the camps and the last of the mines had closed many years before. It is also rumoured that Zátopek had a short stint at refuse collection, but was let go as he was unable to complete a round without a horde of citizens insisting on helping him, though no evidence exists of this ever happening.

In 1977, after 5 years of working and living away from his wife and friends, Zátopek's spirit was broken and the communist government, no longer deeming him a threat, allowed him back to Prague with the offer of a further humiliating and menial job in the ČSTV (Czechoslovak Union of Physical Education). As the only option to get back to Prague and his wife, Zátopek accepted the offer. Using his gift as a linguist, the ČSTV put him to work monitoring foreign publications for the latest developments in sports science and training techniques. It was a lowly job shuffling papers in a small office under Strahov stadium. He dutifully served until his retirement in the early 1980s.

On 9 March 1990, Zátopek was rehabilitated by Václav Havel.

Zátopek died in Prague on 22 November 2000 at the age of 78, from the complications of a stroke. His funeral at Prague's National Theatre was crowded with leading figures from the international sports world.

Zátopek was awarded the Pierre de Coubertin medal (the "True Spirit of Sportsmanship" medal) in 1975. In 2012, he was named among the first twelve athletes to be inducted into the IAAF Hall of Fame. A life-size bronze statue of Zátopek was unveiled at the Stadium of Youth in Zlín in September 2014.

In popular culture
The 2021 film Zátopek focuses on his personal life and sports career.

The most prestigious track race in Australia is named after him.

A Bengali novel by Mati Nandi, Naran (নারান), mentioned him as the role model and motivation of the protagonist, a Bengali Hindu refugee from East Pakistan who relocated to Calcutta in 1947 in order to evade the religious onslaught and build up his life again from the scratch.

The song "Czech Locomotive" by Australian psychedelic rock band Pond off of their album 9 is about him.

References

External links

 
 
 
 
 Emil Zatopek at Running Times
 Emil Zatopek Biography
 Running Past profile of Zatopek
 Archive Video of 5 km Olympic run from Runningpast.com

1922 births
2000 deaths
People from Kopřivnice
Czechoslovak male long-distance runners
Czech male long-distance runners
Czechoslovak male marathon runners
Czech male marathon runners
Olympic athletes of Czechoslovakia
Olympic gold medalists for Czechoslovakia
Olympic silver medalists for Czechoslovakia
Athletes (track and field) at the 1948 Summer Olympics
Athletes (track and field) at the 1952 Summer Olympics
Athletes (track and field) at the 1956 Summer Olympics
European Athletics Championships medalists
World record setters in athletics (track and field)
Recipients of Medal of Merit (Czech Republic)
Recipients of the Pierre de Coubertin medal
Medalists at the 1952 Summer Olympics
Medalists at the 1948 Summer Olympics
Olympic gold medalists in athletics (track and field)
Olympic silver medalists in athletics (track and field)
Czechoslovak military personnel of World War II
Sportspeople from the Moravian-Silesian Region